Dance Dance Revolution Universe 2, sometimes abbreviated as Universe 2, is a music video game for the North American Xbox 360. Published by Konami and developed by Hudson Soft on December 4, 2007, Universe 2 is a sequel to Dance Dance Revolution Universe released earlier the same year. Universe 2 features a large soundtrack with songs ranging from the 1970s to today, new modes of gameplay designed for newcomers including Freestyle Mode which allows players to dance without needing to step on any arrows, Quest Mode where players build a dancing character and travel from location to location in a virtual world facing off against other dancers, and downloadable content through the Xbox Live service. The game was released in Europe with a different set of songs as Dancing Stage Universe 2.

Gameplay

Downloadable Song Pack 
Universe 2 Megapack:
 BATTLE BREAKS - DJ TAKAWO
 Catch it! - TOTAL SCIENCE
 DYNAMITE RAVE - NAOKI
 GRADIUSIC CYBER - TAKA
 Himawari - Riyu from BeForU
 jelly kiss - Togo Project feat. Sana
 Love This Feelin' (ZONK Remix) - Akira Yamaoka
 Moment 40 - Moshic
 Put Your Faith In Me (Saturday Night Mix) - UZI-LAY
 Toe Jam - Big Idea

Music
Songs with a padlock next to them have to be unlocked after certain conditions are met in the game.

References

External links

2007 video games
Dance Dance Revolution games
Multiplayer online games
Video games developed in the United States
Xbox 360-only games
Xbox 360 games